New England Air Transport (NEAT) is a boutique air transportation services company that operates a Pilatus PC-12 aircraft seasonally from bases in New England and South Florida with flights to all islands in the Bahamas.  The PC-12 is configured with a 6-passenger executive interior, and can travel at 300 miles per hour.

Destinations
South Florida
Bahamas
Northeast US

Fleet
Pilatus PC-12

See also 
 List of defunct airlines of Canada

External links
Official Website

Defunct airlines of the United States
Airlines based in Maine
Defunct companies based in Maine